Tomas Kalnoky (born December 24, 1980) is a Czechoslovakia-born American musician. He is the lead singer/guitarist and songwriter of the bands Streetlight Manifesto and Bandits of the Acoustic Revolution, and goes by the pseudonym Toh Kay as a solo performer.  He is the former lead singer/guitarist for 3rd-wave ska band Catch 22, but left the band after making only one album (their debut, Keasbey Nights) to attend Savannah College of Art and Design in Savannah, Georgia, for visual art. According to the booklet of Somewhere in the Between, Kalnoky attended Rutgers University. He is the owner of Pentimento Music Company, a record company.

Biography
Kalnoky's family (which is a historical family from Transylvania, back then being part of Hungary, now belongs to Romania) emigrated from Czechoslovakia to the U.S. in 1985, when he was 5 years old. He has one brother, Achilles, who is a year older than he is. During a live performance in Greece in 2008, Tomas stated that he was of Greek descent and had lived in the country for several years. He, however, had to leave the country because due to his Greek citizenship, he would have had to serve in the Greek Military. At a show at the Glass House in Pomona, CA, Kalnoky stated that he lived close by in the same city and was revealing this information only because he had just moved recently.

Raised in East Brunswick, New Jersey, he graduated in 1997 from East Brunswick High School.

Kalnoky said he learned to play guitar because of influence from The Beatles. His first foray into the music world began with the punk band Gimp, with whom he released one cassette, Smiles for Macavity, before moving onto Catch 22 (with fellow Gimp members drummer Chris Greer and bassist Jason Scharenguivel). It was in Gimp that Kalnoky first wrote the song "Supernothing" which later appeared on the Catch 22 demo Rules of the Game (EP) and the album Keasbey Nights. However, the original version is a much slower acoustic song, which features Kalnoky's brother Achilles on violin (Achilles would later appear on the Bandits EP A Call to Arms, as well as on the first volume of "99 songs of Revolution"). Kalnoky is involved in The RISC Group, of which very little is known.

After Kalnoky departed Catch 22, three ex-members of Catch 22, Tomas Kalnoky, Josh Ansley, and Jamie Egan, joined with three ex-One Cool Guy members, Stuart Karmatz, Dan Ross, and Pete Sibilia, to form Streetlight Manifesto.  Despite the horn section, Kalnoky is hesitant to brand them "ska" saying, "Ska is something that you have to tread so lightly with because there are so many, ironically, Nazi-like purists out there who will rip you apart because you don't fit the part of the 'ska band'".

Kalnoky's influences are many, the blending of which creates Streetlight's signature sound.  Kalnoky cites The Drifters as a favorite band. Other musical influences include Bad Religion, Nirvana, The Suicide Machines, Squirrel Nut Zippers, and The Dead Milkmen. He has mentioned Czech folk singer Jaromir Nohavica as one of his musical heroes. During one of his early interviews, Kalnoky cited American pop-folk singer Mason Jennings as one of his current CDs playing in his car. Streetlight Manifesto recorded Jennings' Birds Flying Away as a track on "99 Songs of Revolution."

During the 2009 Van's Warped Tour Tomas fractured his arm in a bicycle accident, rendering him incapable of playing guitar. Guitar player Sean P. Rogan of Big D and the Kids Table filled Tomas' spot on guitar while his arm healed. Tomas continued, however, to take up the microphone and sing the band's set.

Kalnoky is a self-proclaimed perfectionist, explaining the persistent delay of Streetlight Manifesto's second original album, Somewhere in the Between, and the next album by the Bandits of the Acoustic Revolution, which he said in 2007 "will be released by the end of this decade." As of 2022, said BOTAR album has not been released.

In 2010, Streetlight Manifesto released the first volume of 99 Songs of Revolution, the first of "...8 or so records that focus entirely on playing music that other musicians have written."  One of the songs however, "They Provide the Paint for the Picture Perfect Masterpiece that You Will Paint on the Insides of Your Eyelids," is originally written by Tomas and performed by his "side project," Bandits of the Acoustic Revolution.  The project/record was originally planned to be solely by Bandits of the Acoustic Revolution, but, as time went on, it faded into a project containing both Streetlight and BOTAR, as well as 2 other potential bands.  For this reason, BOTAR has been called "the single least prolific musical group on the face of the planet," by the Pentimento Music Company, a member of the RISC Group.  Also in 2010, Kalnoky released a split CD with Dan Potthast entitled You By Me: Vol. 1, under the pseudonym "Toh Kay."  The first official Toh Kay music video is his interpretation of "I've Set Sail," originally by Dan Potthast, animated by Eric Power of Inked Reality.

On January 29, 2013, Kalnoky announced that he would perform 7 shows as part of The Revival Tour alongside Chuck Ragan, Dave Hause of The Loved Ones, Jenny Owen Youngs, Rocky Votolato, Jenny O., and Tim McIlrath of Rise Against. He would later announce 5 additional dates.

Toh Kay released You By Me: Vol. 2 with fellow Pentimento Artist Sycamore Smith.

Discography

Gimp
Smiles for Macavity (Cassette) (1996)

Catch 22
Rules of the Game (EP) (Cassette) (1997)
Keasbey Nights (1998)

Bandits of the Acoustic Revolution
A Call to Arms (EP)  (2001)

Streetlight Manifesto
Streetlight Manifesto Demo (EP) (2002)
Everything Goes Numb (August 26, 2003)
Keasbey Nights (March 7, 2006)
Somewhere in the Between (November 13, 2007)
99 Songs of Revolution: Vol. 1  (March 16, 2010) 
The Hands That Thieve (April 30, 2013)

Toh Kay
You By Me: Vol. 1 (With Dan Potthast of MU330 and The Stitch Up) (November 16, 2010)
Streetlight Lullabies (November 22, 2011)
The Hands That Thieve (April 30, 2013) 
You By Me: Vol. 2 (with Sycamore Smith, formerly of the Muldoons) (August 12, 2014)

References

External links

Streetlight Manifesto
Bandits of the Acoustic Revolution
The Work of Tomas Kalnoky

1980 births
Living people
American male singer-songwriters
American people of Czech descent
American rock guitarists
American rock songwriters
American rock singers
American ska guitarists
American male guitarists
American ska singers
Singer-songwriters from New Jersey
East Brunswick High School alumni
People from East Brunswick, New Jersey
Guitarists from New Jersey
21st-century American singers
21st-century American guitarists
21st-century American male singers
Czechoslovak emigrants to the United States